Lindford is a village and civil parish in the East Hampshire district of Hampshire, England.

With a population of around 2,700, Lindford has a village shop, post office, private dental practice, hair dresser, as well as a Methodist church, a village hall, a pub, The Royal Exchange, and a club.

Lindford Village Hall

As part of the permission granted on The Chase development, a new village hall was built. This hall is used for a number of activities including, a nursery school, Brownies, and dance classes.

Headley Water Mill
At the southeast end of the village is Headley Water Mill, dating in part from the 16th century, or earlier.

Worship

Lindford Methodist Church is the only church in the village. The Anglican parish church is All Saints' Church in Headley

There is also a Church Centre on the outskirts of Lindford in Headley. It hosts groups and clubs, guides, Brownies, rainbows, Cub Scout, Scouts, a Sunday school and holds fetes and charity sales.

References

External links

Lindford Parish Council
Lindford Methodist Church

Villages in Hampshire